The Brawner Hawk is a series of open-wheel race car chassis designed and developed by automotive mechanic and engineer Clint Brawner for U.S.A.C. Indy car racing, between 1965 and 1969. It successfully won the 1969 Indianapolis 500, while in the hands of, and being driven by Mario Andretti.

References

Indianapolis 500
American Championship racing cars
Open wheel racing cars